Brunello is an Italian masculine given name

Brunello Bertolin (born 1943), long-distance runner
Brunello Rondi (1924–1989), screenwriter and film director
Brunello Spinelli (1939–2018), Italian water polo player
Brunello Cucinelli (born 1953), billionaire fashion designer

See also 

 Brunello (surname)
 Brunello (disambiguation)
 Bruno (given name)

Italian masculine given names